Andrea Loberto (born 7 November 1974) is an Italian football manager who is currently assistant manager of Stabæk in Norway.

Moving to Norway to pursue a career there, he was youth coach in Vålerenga and Rosenborg before becoming assistant manager of Haugesund. He became manager on a caretaker basis in the summer of 2016, overseeing the second half of 2016 Eliteserien. In 2017 he managed Fredrikstad, before returning to the assistant manager role at Aalesund and Brann. After Brann was relegated, Loberto applied for the position as player developer at Vålerenga, and edged out 82 other applicants to get the job. Before the end of the year, he was signed by Stabæk as their new assistant manager ahead of the 2023 season. In this, Loberto reunited with his old manager from Aalesund, Lars Bohinen.

References

1974 births
Living people
Italian football managers
Vålerenga Fotball non-playing staff
Rosenborg BK non-playing staff
FK Haugesund managers
Fredrikstad FK managers
Aalesunds FK non-playing staff
SK Brann non-playing staff
Stabæk Fotball non-playing staff
Eliteserien managers
Italian expatriate football managers
Expatriate football managers in Norway
Italian expatriate sportspeople in Norway